Shaun Harold Venter (born 16 March 1987 in Witbank) is a South African rugby union player for USM Sapiac in the Pro D2 He is a utility back, having started matches at full-back, centre, winger and scrum-half, but since 2011 he has been predominantly used as a scrum-half.

Career

Pumas
After playing for them at Under-19 and Under-21 level, he made his debut in the 2007 Vodacom Cup competition.

Kings
He played in all sixteen of the Kings' matches that season, thirteen starts and three appearances as a substitute.

Cheetahs

Ospreys
He has signed a 2-year contract with  until the end of the 2020–21 Pro14 season.

Bayonne
On 13 July 2021, Venter travels to France as he signs for Bayonne in the second-tier Pro D2 from the 2021-22 season.

References

Living people
1987 births
South African rugby union players
Rugby union scrum-halves
Southern Kings players
Pumas (Currie Cup) players
Cheetahs (rugby union) players
People from Witbank
Afrikaner people
South Africa international rugby sevens players
Free State Cheetahs players
Ospreys (rugby union) players
Aviron Bayonnais players